Bualadh Bos (English: Clap your Hands) – The Cranberries Live is a live album from the Irish band The Cranberries, released by Island Records on 10 November 2009.

Track listing

Chart performance
Bualadh Bos – The Cranberries Live peaked at #29 in Greece and #99 in Mexico.

References

The Cranberries albums
2009 live albums
Island Records live albums